Lisa Smith may refer to:

Lisa Marie (actress) (Lisa Marie Smith, born 1968), American model and actress
Lisa Smith-Batchen (born 1960), ultramarathon runner and ironman competitor
L. J. Smith (author) (Lisa Jane Smith)
Lisa F. Smith, US-New Zealand education academic
Lisa Smith, member of grunge band Dickless 
Lisa Smith (soldier) (born 1981), Irish soldier